Samuel Houston Jones (July 15, 1897 – February 8, 1978) was the 46th Governor of Louisiana for the term from  1940 to 1944. He defeated the renowned Earl Kemp Long in the 1940 Democratic runoff primary election. Eight years later, Long then in a reversal of 1940 defeated Jones in the 1948 party primary.

Early life
Samuel Jones was born in Merryville in Beauregard Parish and grew up in nearby DeRidder. He served in the United States Army during World War I. Much of his service was spent at nearby Camp Beauregard in Pineville, Louisiana. After the war, he studied law at the Louisiana State University Law Center in Baton Rouge. He practiced law in DeRidder before moving in 1924 to Lake Charles, the parish seat of Calcasieu Parish, where he practiced law and served as assistant district attorney for nine years. Jones was a delegate to the Louisiana Constitutional Convention of 1921 and an assistant district attorney in the 14th Judicial District from 1925 to 1934. Jones married the former Louise Gambrell Boyer (1902–1996), and they had two children, Robert Gambrell "Bob" Jones and Carolyn Jelks Jones. He adopted Mrs. Boyer's children from her previous marriage, James G. Boyer and William E. Boyer. He also had a tabby (cat) named Katt.

Election of 1940

In August 1939, Jones was approached by members of the political faction opposed to the policies of the late Huey Pierce Long Jr. to run for governor in 1940 against Huey's brother, Earl Long. Though initially reluctant, Jones agreed, and ran on a platform promising a return to honest efficient government after the corruption and excesses of the Long years.  He particularly emphasized "the scandals" involving Huey Long's successor as governor, Richard W. Leche. Earl Long led in the primary round of voting, but with support from defeated third-place candidate and disgruntled former Long supporter James A. Noe, Jones won a close victory in the runoff election and became governor. Jones received 284,437 (51.7 percent) to Long's 265,403 (48.3 percent). Although Noe and Long quarreled in the 1940 election, they ran—unsuccessfully—as a ticket for governor and lieutenant governor, respectively, in the 1959 Democratic primary. Eliminated in the 1940 primary was future U.S. Representative James H. Morrison of Hammond in the "Florida Parishes" east of Baton Rouge.

Jones as governor

As governor, Jones tried to eliminate the power of the Longite political machine by reducing the number of state employees, instituting competitive bidding for state contracts, eliminating the deduct system of mandatory campaign contributions by state employees, and enacting civil service, much of that work having been undertaken in 1940 by the Tulane Law School professor Charles E. Dunbar and completed in 1952 in the Robert F. Kennon administration. Jones worked to increase international trade through the Louisiana ports on the Gulf of Mexico.

He signed the Public Records Act of 1940, which declared most state documents public records and laid the groundwork for the development of the state archives through the work of the historian Edwin Adams Davis.

Joe T. Cawthorn of Mansfield in DeSoto Parish, chaired the Senate Finance Committee but became a persistent critic of Governor Jones, after Jones split politically with former Governor James A. Noe of Monroe, who had been Cawthorn's political mentor. Cawthorn accused Jones of "waste and inefficiency" in state government and was soon allied with the Long faction.

Jones obtained legislative approval of the establishment of a state crime commission, which consisted of the governor, his executive counsel, and the state attorney general. With a $1 million appropriation, the agency was commissioned to pursue those who had stolen state funds or property. Jones suggested that up to $4 million might be recovered. In the state House, Representative James E. Bolin of Minden in Webster Parish sought to reduce the appropriation to $250,000. State Senator Lloyd Hendrick of Shreveport wanted to establish a legislative commission, rather than an executive body. Nevertheless, the measure easily passed both houses and was signed into law. A few lawmakers loyal to then former Governor Earl Long charged that the commission gave too much power to the governor and was "tyrannical" in nature. They sued in the 19th Judicial District Court, which subpoenaed Jones to testify. The governor refused to do so, having cited an executive privilege dating back to U.S. President Thomas Jefferson. The opponents pursued the challenge to the Louisiana Supreme Court, which declared the Jones commission unconstitutional.

Jones tapped as state House Speaker the returning State Representative Ralph Norman Bauer of St. Mary Parish, who had in 1929 with Cecil Morgan of Shreveport, led the impeachment forces against Huey Long on charges of abuses of power.

Jones was barred from succeeding himself as governor, and therefore (see 1944 Louisiana gubernatorial election) was succeeded in 1944 by another anti-Long candidate, Jimmie Houston Davis. Coincidentally, Jones and Davis shared the middle name "Houston."

Jones supported highway beautification and preservation of plants and wildlife. His administration hired the Louisiana botanist and naturalist Caroline Dormon of Natchitoches Parish as a consultant for the Louisiana Highway Department.

After the governorship
Jones attempted a gubernatorial comeback in the 1947–1948 election cycle. He assembled an intra-party slate, including the incumbent Lieutenant Governor J. Emile Verret of New Iberia, who failed in a bid for reelection against Long's choice, Bill Dodd. Fred S. LeBlanc, former mayor of Baton Rouge, ran on the Jones slate for |attorney general; also D. Ross Banister of Monroe, Louisiana ran for state auditor and Grady Durham for secretary of state on the Jones slate. Dave L. Pearce of West Carroll Parish ran for agriculture commissioner on the Jones slate; so did Ellen Bryan Moore as a candidate for register of state lands, who unsuccessfully opposed the incumbent Lucille May Grace. Shelby M. Jackson, the successful candidate for state education superintendent against John E. Coxe, also allied himself with Jones.

Jones and Earl Long led in the primary and hence entered a gubernatorial runoff in which Long handily defeated Jones, 432,528 votes (65.9 percent) to 223,971 ballots (34.1 percent). Other candidates eliminated in the primary were later Governor Robert F. Kennon [U.S. Representative James H. Morrison.

Jones hence returned to Lake Charles to practice law, but he remained a politically prominent member of the anti-Long faction throughout the 1950s. In 1964, Jones endorsed the Republican presidential nominee, Senator Barry M. Goldwater of Arizona, who won Louisiana's ten electoral votes. Jones said that he would remain a Democrat so that he could vote in pivotal Louisiana Democratic primaries—this was before the adoption of the Louisiana nonpartisan blanket primary—but that overall he was disillusioned with his ancestral party.

In 2016, Jones was posthumously inducted into the Louisiana Political Museum and Hall of Fame in Winnfield, twenty-three years after the inclusion of his old rival, Earl Long.

References

 Conrad, Glenn R.  (1988)  A Dictionary of Louisiana Biography.  Louisiana Historical Association.
 Davis, Edwin Adams (1961) Louisiana: The Pelican State. Baton Rouge: Louisiana State University Press. LCCN 59:9008.
 Jeansonne, Glen, "Sam Houston Jones and the Revolution of 1940."  Red River Valley Historical Review 4 (1979).
 Nash, Bill. High Hat Sam: The Life and Times of Louisiana Governor Sam Houston Jones. Springfield, Missouri : James E. Cornwell, 2014. 
 Reeves, Miriam G. (1998), The Governors of Louisiana. Gretna: Pelican Publishing.
 Sanson, Jerry Purvis.  "Sam Jones, Jimmie Noe, and the Reform Alliance, 1940–1942"  Louisiana History 27 (1986).

External links
 State of Louisiana – Biography
 Cemetery Memorial by La-Cemeteries
 Political Graveyard

1897 births
1978 deaths
Democratic Party governors of Louisiana
Louisiana lawyers
Louisiana State University Law Center alumni
Politicians from Lake Charles, Louisiana
People from Beauregard Parish, Louisiana
United States Army soldiers
United States Army personnel of World War I
20th-century American politicians
Southern Methodists
American United Methodists
People from DeRidder, Louisiana
Burials in Louisiana
20th-century American lawyers
20th-century Methodists
Old Right (United States)